The lined antshrike (Thamnophilus tenuepunctatus) is a species of bird in the family Thamnophilidae.

It is found in Colombia, Ecuador, and Peru.

Its natural habitats are subtropical or tropical moist lowland forests and subtropical or tropical moist montane forests.  It is relatively numerous but secretive along forest borders.

Description
A medium-sized (16.5 cm, 6.5") passerine bird with a hooked bill. The male is black and white; and the female has a rufous crest and back.

References

lined antshrike
Birds of the Colombian Andes
Birds of the Ecuadorian Andes
Birds of the Peruvian Andes
lined antshrike
Taxonomy articles created by Polbot